Richard J Outterside (born 1962), is a retired male badminton player from England.

Badminton career
Outterside represented England and won a gold medal in the team event and competed in the mixed doubles, at the 1986 Commonwealth Games in Edinburgh, Scotland.

Other wins include the 1980 English Individual Junior Championship (men's doubles), the 1988 Welsh International (men's doubles) and the 1992 Gibraltar International (men's doubles).

References

English male badminton players
Living people
1962 births
Commonwealth Games medallists in badminton
Commonwealth Games gold medallists for England
Badminton players at the 1986 Commonwealth Games
Medallists at the 1986 Commonwealth Games